Perez Glacier is a glacier, 10 nautical miles (18 km) long, flowing northeast from Mount Brennan in the Hughes Range to the Ross Ice Shelf east of Giovinco Ice Piedmont. Named by Advisory Committee on Antarctic Names (US-ACAN) for Ensign Richard Perez, U.S. Navy, of Squadron VX-6, Antarctic Support Activity, who participated in USN. Operation Deepfreeze 1964; wintered at McMurdo Station in 1961.

Glaciers of Dufek Coast